Merri may refer to:

People
 Merri Dee (1936-2022), American journalist and philanthropist
 Merri Franquin (1848-1934), French trumpeter
 Merri Rose (born 1955), Australian politician

Places
 Merri, Orne, France
 Merri Creek, Australia
 Merri railway station, Victoria, Australia
 Merri River, Australia
 Saint-Merri, Paris, France

Other
 Merri Merri, Albanian song

See also
 Merry (disambiguation)